Drasteria stretchii is a species of moth in the family Erebidae. It is found in North America, where it has been recorded from northern Nevada., California, Oregon, Wyoming and Washington. The habitat consists of dry, rocky canyons at low to middle elevations.

The length of the forewings is 15–17 mm. The forewings are brown, but dark at the base to the antemedial line, lighter to the postmedial line and dark between the postmedial and subterminal lines. The hindwings are orange-red with a thin black discal spot, postmedial line and marginal band. Adults are on wing from the beginning of June to July.

The larvae possibly feed on Eriogonum species.

References

Drasteria
Moths described in 1870
Moths of North America